"Fast Response Car" (FRC) is the official term for police cars used by the Singapore Police Force, the national police force of Singapore. Prior to 2000, they were known in public simply as "police patrol cars".

Fast Response Cars are usually composed of sedans. Unlike civilian vehicles in Singapore in which speed limiters (speed governors) are installed to prevent over-speeding, Police Fast Response Cars are able to reach their maximum speed potential without hindrance when the need arises. 

Originally restricted to team leader vehicles during the 1990s, all current FRCs carry a large array of equipment to allow officers to conduct normal policing duties and basic investigative work which officers are expected to perform with the implementation of the Neighbourhood Police Centre (NPC) system. A typical FRC may therefore stock equipment for the force-opening of locked doors, conducting roadblocks, fingerprint collection, and the provision of first aid. Chemical agent protection equipment and bulletproof vests are also carried for the officer's protection. 

The Mitsubishi Galant and Opel Astra series of FRCs, which were bought in very limited numbers, were the only police cars in local history to use aerodynamic lightbars. All other police vehicles to date use the block-shaped design.

Fast Response Vehicle

Originally unveiled in 2002 at the Singapore Police Force's annual workplan seminar, the Enhanced Patrol Vehicle Project was presented to highlight the need for police off-road capability. The Volvo V70 AWD XC, Mitsubishi Space Wagon and Mitsubishi Chariot underwent evaluation in various Neighbourhood Police Centres. They also provide bigger storage for additional equipment like undercarriage mirrors. All NPCs were to have at least three of such vehicles eventually, but as of 2006, only 6 have been purchased in total (3 Volvo V70 XCs, 3 Mitsubishi Space Wagons/Chariots).

The project underwent several evaluations and in 2004 was re-introduced to the public as the new Enhanced Fast Response Vehicle (FRV), using modified Toyota Hilux twin-cab diesel pick up trucks, more suited for prolonged heavy use on the roads. Achieving both the original and new requirements of the project, the new vehicles' bigger storage space allows easier storage and retrieval of equipment such as chemical agent protective suits and bullet-resistant vests. The SPF plans to have two of these vehicles at all NPCs.

The civilian model of the Toyota Hilux vehicles in use in Singapore is the 2-litre turbo pickup truck. The SPF uses the Australian 3-litre turbo 4WD DOHC model.

Gallery

Fleet

Current

Former

Mazda 323 BJ
Mazda 323 BH
Isuzu Gemini
Mitsubishi Lancer
Mitsubishi Galant
Nissan Pulsar
Nissan Sunny (B15)
BMW E30 320i (Traffic Police)
Opel Astra
Subaru Impreza WRX (Traffic Police)
Ford Escort
Ford Cortina
Volkswagen Beetle
Volvo S40 (Traffic Police)

Gallery

References

Singapore Police Force
Police vehicles